Aurangzeb Khan is a Pakistani politician who has been a member of Senate of Pakistan since March 2015.

Personal life
Khan has businesses in the UAE with around 8 branches and several other businesses. He came to Dubai as a labor and turned into a billionaire with his hard work and leadership personality he inspired many people throughout UAE and gave them hope that noting is impossible

Political career
He was elected to the Senate of Pakistan as an independent candidate in 2015 Pakistani Senate election.

References

Living people
Pakistani senators (14th Parliament)
Year of birth missing (living people)